The 1989 Nutri-Metics Open was a women's tennis tournament played on outdoor hard courts at the ASB Tennis Centre in Auckland in New Zealand and was part of the Category 1 tier of the 1989 WTA Tour. The tournament ran from 30 January through 5 February 1989. First-seeded Patty Fendick won the singles title.

Finals

Singles

 Patty Fendick defeated  Belinda Cordwell 6–2, 6–0
 It was Fendick's 1st title of the year and the 9th of her career.

Doubles

 Patty Fendick /  Jill Hetherington defeated  Elizabeth Smylie /  Janine Thompson 6–4, 6–4
 It was Fendick's 2nd title of the year and the 10th of her career. It was Hetherington's 1st title of the year and the 8th of her career.

See also
 1989 Benson and Hedges Open – men's tournament

External links
 Official website
 ITF tournament edition details
 Tournament draws

Nutri-Metics Open
WTA Auckland Open
Ten
Ten
ASB
ASB